Riverdance: The Animated Adventure is a 2021 computer-animated adventure film inspired by the dance show Riverdance. The film was made by Cinesite for River Productions and Aniventure.

Riverdance: The Animated Adventure was released in the United Kingdom on 28 May 2021, by Sky Cinema, and was made available to stream on Netflix on 14 January 2022 in the United States.

Plot
The animated film follows a young Irish boy named Keegan, who’s been at a heart loss after his grandfather - a well-known dancer - had passed away. He and his Spanish friend Moya go on a journey to a magical world to learn about Riverdance as well as the dangers of the Huntsman.

Cast
 Pierce Brosnan as Patrick and Grandad
 Sam Hardy as Keegan
 Hannah Herman Cortes as Moya
 Lilly Singh as Penny
 Jermaine Fowler as Benny
 Pauline McLynn as Grandma
 John Kavanagh as the Gatekeeper
 Aisling Bea as Margot
 Brendan Gleeson as the Huntsman

Production and release
In 2016, it was announced that Cinesite Studios was aiming to produce nine animated movies across a five year period, one of which included a film about Riverdance. Cinesite then announced in 2018 that it had secured funding to begin working on a number of films, including Riverdance.

Production of the film began in February 2020, with an estimated budget of €35 million.

After the film received funding, Pierce Brosnan, Aisling Bea, Brendan Gleeson, Pauline McLynn, John Kavanagh and Lilly Singh were announced as joining the cast. It has Dave Rosenbaum and Eamonn Butler as directors, with Brosnan to voice both 'Patrick' and 'Grandad'. According to Deadline Hollywood, Gleeson and Kavanagh are to voice the villains in the film, though Kavanagh was ultimately cast as a benign character.

The film features music by Irish composer, Bill Whelan. Whelan also served as composer for the original tour of Riverdance in the mid-1990s. Whelan also composed two original songs for the film's end credits; "Light Me Up", co-written with Irish singer Lyra, and a remix of the trademark Riverdance music.

The film was released exclusively on Sky Cinema in May 2021 and to streaming platform Netflix on 14 January 2022.

Critical reception

Kevin Courtney of The Irish Times said the actors spoke with good Irish accents.  But he worried that the movie only shows Irish people living in perfect villages and dancing all the time.  He said the movie is sometimes like a Fáilte Ireland tourism advertisement.

Dierdre Molumby of Entertainment said this movie is "exhaustingly bad".

References

External links
 

British animated films
2021 computer-animated films
2020s English-language films
2020s British films